José Maria da Ponte e Horta (1824 in Faro – 9 March 1892) was a Portuguese noble who served as a colonial administrator and soldier in the Portuguese Empire.  He is best known for his roles as the two time Governor of Angola and the Governor of Macau and Governor of Mozambique.

Biography 
José Maria da Ponte e Horta was born to a Portuguese noble family in 1824.

Ponte e Horta joined the Portuguese military and later went on to serve as a professor at the Escola Politécnica de Lisboa and was named Par do Reino, one of the highest honors of Portuguese society.

On 26 October 1866, Ponte e Horta became the Portuguese Governor of Macau, a position which he held for two years until 3 August 1868.

In 1870, he again held a top colonial office, being named the Governor of Angola which was at the time, a Portuguese colony. He remained Governor of Portuguese Angola until 1873.

Many sources state that Ponte e Horta also held the post of Governor of Cabo Verde, however he does not appear in other records as having held that position.

Death and legacy
José Maria da Ponte e Horta died on 9 March 1892. There are several streets and buildings named after him in Macau.

Published works
 Memória sobre os Infinitamente Pequenos.

See also 
 Colonial Macau
 Portuguese Angola

References 

Governors of Macau
Governors of Portuguese Angola
1824 births
1892 deaths
People from Faro, Portugal
19th century in Macau
1860s in the Portuguese Empire
1860s in China
1870s in Angola
19th-century Portuguese people